Bongo Fury is a collaborative album by American artists Frank Zappa and the Mothers, with Captain Beefheart, released in October 1975. The live portions were recorded on May 20 and 21, 1975, at the Armadillo World Headquarters in Austin, Texas. Tracks 5, 6 and 9 (intro only) are studio tracks recorded in January 1975 during the sessions which produced One Size Fits All (1975) and much of Studio Tan (1978).

Overview
The album is a notable entry in Zappa's discography, because it was the last to feature a majority of his early 1970s band, which appeared on Over-Nite Sensation (1973), Apostrophe (') (1974), Roxy & Elsewhere (1974), and One Size Fits All (1975).

Napoleon Murphy Brock's vocals are featured both on the sprawling "Advance Romance" as well as on the three-part harmonies of "Carolina Hard-Core Ecstasy". Captain Beefheart, in his only tour with Zappa's band, delivers vocals and harmonica on several tracks, including his two short prose readings "Sam with the Showing Scalp Flat Top" and "Man with the Woman Head". Bongo Fury also marks the first appearance of Terry Bozzio, who would become Zappa's featured drummer between 1975 and 1978.

Critical reception 
Reviewing in Christgau's Record Guide: Rock Albums of the Seventies (1981), Robert Christgau wrote: "This sentimental reunion album, recorded (where else?) in Austin with (what else?) additional L.A. studio work, is dismissed by Zappaphiles and 'Fhearthearts alike, but what were they expecting? Perhaps because there's a blues avatar up top, the jazzy music has a soulful integrity, and though it's embarrassing to hear the Captain deliver Frankie's latest pervo exploitations, the rest of the songs are funnier because he's singing them."

Track listing 
All tracks performed by Frank Zappa, Captain Beefheart and The Mothers; all tracks composed by Zappa, except where noted. This is the last original Frank Zappa album on which the band name "The Mothers [of Invention]" is used.

Personnel

Musicians 
 Frank Zappa – lead guitar, lead (2, 5, 6, 9) and backing vocals
 Captain Beefheart – harp, lead (1, 3, 4, 5, 8, 9) and backing vocals, shopping bags (also soprano sax)
 George Duke – keyboards, lead (2, 7) and backing vocals
 Napoleon Murphy Brock – sax, lead (2, 7) and backing vocals
 Bruce Fowler – trombone, fantastic dancing
 Tom Fowler – bass, also dancing
 Denny Walley – slide guitar, backing vocals
 Terry Bozzio – drums, moisture
 Chester Thompson – drums (on "200 Years Old" and "Cucamonga")
 Robert "Frog" Camarena – backing vocals on "Debra Kadabra" (uncredited)

Production staff 
 Michael Braunstein – engineer
 Frank Hubach – engineer
 Kelly Kotera – engineer
 Kerry McNabb – engineer
 Davey Moire – engineer
 Cal Schenkel – design
 John Williams – photography, cover photo
 Bob Stone – engineer
 Mike D. Stone of the Record Plant – engineer

Charts 
Album - Billboard (United States)

References 

1975 live albums
Collaborative albums
Captain Beefheart albums
DiscReet Records albums
Frank Zappa live albums